Twelve Minutes After Midnight (German: Zwölf Minuten nach zwölf) is a 1939 German comedy crime film directed by Johannes Guter and starring Geraldine Katt, Ursula Herking and René Deltgen.

Synopsis
In Stockholm a young female law student investigates a series of jewel thefts that have been baffling the police.

Cast
 Geraldine Katt as Ingrid Barko  
 Ursula Herking as Nelly Eklund  
 René Deltgen as Niels Terström  
 Carl Raddatz as Juwelenmakler Griffin  
 Rudolf Platte as Karl Jensemann  
 Paul Henckels as Juwelier Anders 
 Boris Alekin as Betrunkener Ganove  
 Wilhelm Althaus as Kommissar Svenson  
 Walter Bechmann 
 Paul Bildt as Gerichtsvorsitzender  
 Hildegard Busse as Lydia Duval  
 Werner Funck as Ganove  
 Fred Goebel as Kriminalkommissar in Oslo  
 Hanna Lussnigg as Susanne  
 Gustav Mahncke as Michalski's Diener 
 Carl Merznicht 
 Manfred Meurer as Michalski's Komplize  
 Hermann Meyer-Falkow as Wachbeamter bei Gericht  
 Fridtjof Mjøen as John Williams  
 Heinz Müller as Wirt der Ganovenkneipe  
 Friedrich Ohse as Ganove 
 Klaus Pohl as Gauner Collin  
 Anton Pointner as Hock  
 Alfred Pussert as Wachbeamter  
 Arthur Reinhardt as Wachmann beim Juwelenraub  
 Oscar Sabo as Zugschaffner  
 Hermann Schröder as Zuschauer bei Gerichtsverhandlung  
 Hugo Steinweg 
 Eva Tinschmann as Pensionswirtin

References

Bibliography
 Kreimeier, Klaus. The Ufa Story: A History of Germany's Greatest Film Company, 1918-1945. University of California Press, 1999.

External links 
 

1939 films
1930s crime comedy films
German crime comedy films
Films of Nazi Germany
1930s German-language films
Films directed by Johannes Guter
UFA GmbH films
Films set in Stockholm
German black-and-white films
1939 comedy films
1930s German films